Rampura Jawaharwala is a village located at , 9 km southeast of Lehragaga, in Sangrur district of the Punjab. Distance 4 km from Lehra Gaga and 53 km from district headquarters Sangrur.

Geography
Rampura Jawaharwala (village) is situated on Lehragaga to Moonak and Jakhal Link Road .

Demographics

 India census,  Rampura Jawaharwala had a population of 1272 Males 693  and females 579. There were 231 households. The Village has a School Government High School Rampura Jawaharwala

References

Villages in Sangrur district